Duke Ding may refer to:

 Duke Ding of Qi, 10th century ruler of Qi
 Duke Ding of Jin (died 475 BCE), ruler of Jin